Daniel Rolim Oliveira (born 12 July 1985) is a Brazilian rally driver.

Career
On entering the Intercontinental Rally Challenge in the 2010 season Oliveira was known only locally. He participated in ten rallies during the season, achieving two points at the Rally Internacional de Curitiba.

In 2011, he moved up to the World Rally Championship driving a MINI Countryman WRC for the new rally team Brazil World Rally Team. He moved to a Ford Fiesta in 2012, but disappeared from the WRC at seasons' end.

Racing record

WRC results

IRC results

References

External links
 Brazil World Rally Team
 Daniel Oliveira Official Fan Page
 Daniel Oliveira Official Twitter

Living people
1985 births
World Rally Championship drivers
Intercontinental Rally Challenge drivers
Brazilian rally drivers
Sportspeople from Salvador, Bahia